The 2017 Las Vegas Challenger was a professional tennis tournament played on hard courts. It was the third edition of the revamped tournament which was the part of the 2017 ATP Challenger Tour. It took place in Las Vegas, United States between 16 and 22 October 2017.

Singles main draw entrants

Seeds

 1 Rankings are as of October 10, 2017.

Other entrants
The following players received wildcards into the singles main draw:
  Ruben Alberts
  JC Aragone
  Alexander Cozbinov
  Mikael Torpegaard

The following player received entry into the singles main draw as a special exempt:
  Christopher O'Connell

The following player received entry into the singles main draw using a protected ranking:
  Bradley Klahn

The following players received entry from the qualifying draw:
  Jan Choinski
  Jared Hiltzik
  Benjamin Lock
  Karue Sell

The following players received entry as lucky losers:
  Takanyi Garanganga
  Alex Rybakov

Champions

Singles

  Stefan Kozlov def.  Liam Broady 3–6, 7–5, 6–4.

Doubles

  Brydan Klein /  Joe Salisbury def.  Hans Hach Verdugo /  Dennis Novikov 6–3, 4–6, [10–3].

References

Las Vegas Challenger
Tennis in Las Vegas
Las Vegas Challenger
2017 in American tennis
2017 in sports in Nevada